The Liberal Party (PL), better known as Great Liberal Party of Venezuela (GPLV), was a political party in Venezuela, founded on August 20, 1840, by Antonio Leocadio Guzmán and Tomás Lander, through an editorial published by Guzmán at El Venezolano newspaper.
It was the rival of the Conservative Party.

History
The party very successfully promoted liberal policies during the early days of the Republic. Several of the early presidents of the country were members of the Liberal Party, including José Tadeo Monagas (in office from 1 March 1847 – 5 February 1851 and 20 January 1855 – 15 March 1858) who abolished capital punishment for political crimes. President José Gregorio Monagas proclaimed that Venezuela was a nation free of slavery in an edict signed on 24 March 1854. In 1863, under the leadership of President Juan Crisóstomo Falcón (in office 15 June 1863 – 25 April 1868), a member of the Liberal Party, Venezuela became the first country to totally abolish the death penalty for all crimes.

Presidents of Venezuela

State of Venezuela (1830–1864)

United States of Venezuela (1864–1953)

Notes

See also
 Federal War
 Dios y Federación
 Liberalism and conservatism in Latin America

Liberal parties in Venezuela
Political parties established in 1840
Political parties disestablished in 1899
Defunct liberal political parties
Defunct political parties in Venezuela